The All-Ireland Junior Football Championship is a GAA competition involving four Junior Gaelic football inter-county teams.

Prior to a change in competition structure in 2021, the competition was previously for all Junior Gaelic football inter-county teams in Ireland. In this previous format, the definition of what constituted a Junior player differed from county to county. In some, the junior team was the second team after the senior team. This meant that any players who had not played with the senior team could play with the junior team. In others, such as Cork and Kerry, players could only be chosen from clubs that played in junior or intermediate grades. These counties could not choose players from senior clubs, even if they were not on the senior county team. When a team won this championship, it had to pick a new team for the following year. No player could thus be on a winning team for two successive years. Ulster did not participate in the Junior Championship for a period, Cavan the 2014 champions represented Leinster in the absence of an Ulster competition.

Kerry are the most successful county in the competition's history, having lifted the title on twenty occasions. Kerry are current winners winning five in a row All Irelands. The 2008 championship was won by Dublin for the first time since 1960. Sligo defeated Kerry in 2010 to win their first title since 1935.

For the bulk of this competition's history up to 2021, the winners of the provincial Junior Football Championships met to decide who was the "Home" winner. This team then met the champion county in Great Britain to determine the All-Ireland Junior Football champion.

At GAA Congress in 2021, a motion was passed to change the entire structure of the All Ireland Junior Football Championship competition to that of a mostly 'overseas competition' along with just one Irish county, Kilkenny. The Junior Football Championship competition therefore now involves just four teams: New York, Kilkenny, and the winner and runner-up of the British Junior Championship, all meeting in the All Ireland Junior Championship semi-finals.

The current holders are Kilkenny, defeating New York by 3-12 to 1-09 in the 2022 final.

Teams

Roll of Honour

Wins by County

Wins by Province

List of Finals

By province

See also
 Munster Junior Football Championship
 Leinster Junior Football Championship
 Connacht Junior Football Championship
 Ulster Junior Football Championship

References

Sources
 Roll of Honour from RTE website
 Roll of Honour from gaainfo.com
 2011 Final Report

 
Junior
 
Gaelic football junior